There are many technical colleges in Jammu and Kashmir. They are affiliated to State Universities such as the University of Kashmir and University of Jammu along with other universities such as Baba Ghulam Shah Badshah University and Islamic University of Science and Technology. Engineering colleges listed below are accredited by All India Council for Technical Education.

Srinagar district

National Institute of Technology, Srinagar

The National Institute of Technology, Srinagar is a national engineering institute located in Hazratbal, Srinagar. It is one of 30 NIT's in India and operates under the control of the Ministry of Human Resource Development (MHRD). NITSRI was established in 1960 as a Regional Engineering College. The institute moved to its present campus in 1965. As a Regional Engineering College, it was affiliated with the University of Kashmir.  The Regional Engineering College was upgraded to become the National Institute of Technology, Srinagar in July, 2003.

Departments

University of Kashmir (North Campus), (South Campus) & (Zakura Campus a.k.a. Institute  of Technology) 
North Campus is situated at Delina, Baramulla. Zakura Campus is situated in Hazratbal. Both are affiliated to University of Kashmir for academic purposes. The campuses are approved by AICTE for their respective technical courses in Engineering. North Campus offers Bachelor of Technology (B.TECH) degree in Computer Science & Engineering while Zakura Campus offers Bachelors of Technology (B.TECH) in Electronics and Communication Engineering, Civil Engineering, Electrical and Electronics Engineering and Mechanical Engineering. The main campus offers courses leading to Masters of Technology (M.Tech) in Computer Science and Embedded Systems. Eligibility for admission to B. Tech courses is JEE Main and GATE for M.Tech programmes.

Ganderbal

GCET Ganderbal Kashmir
Engineering College in Safapora, Ganderbal.

Baramulla district

SSM College of Engineering

SSM College of Engineering is in Pattan, Baramulla and is affiliated to University of Kashmir for academic purposes. The engineering disciplines are Civil engineering, Electrical engineering, Electronics & Communication engineering, Mechanical engineering, Computer Science and Engineering.

Samba district

Bhargava College of Engineering and Technology
Bhargava College of Engineering and Technology is an engineering college located in Samba. This college is approved by AICET and affiliated to University of Jammu. It offers a Bachelor of Engineering degree in  civil, mechanical, electrical, electronics and communication and computer science. It was established in 2015.

Jammu district

Indian Institute of Technology, Jammu

The Indian Institute of Technology Jammu (abbreviated IIT Jammu) is a public research university located in Jammu. The Institute opened in 2016 when a Memorandum of Understanding between the Department of Higher Education, J&K and Department of Higher Education, MHRD, was signed. The institute offers five B.tech programs:  computer science, electrical, mechanical, civil and chemical enrolling 30 in each. The admission to these programs is done through JEE-Advanced.

Model Institute of Engineering and Technology, Jammu

Model Institute of Engineering and Technology is a technical institute located in Bantalab, Jammu. It offers undergraduate degrees in engineering trades and a master's degrees in computer engineering.

MBS College of Engineering & Technology, Digaina 
The college is affiliated to Jammu University for academic purposes. Engineering degrees include Applied Electronics and Instrumentation, Computer, Electrical, Electronics  and Communication, Information Technology and Mechanical.

Government College of Engineering and Technology, Jammu

The Government College of Engineering and Technology, Jammu (GCET, Jammu) is an engineering institute located in Jammu. It offers Bachelor of Engineering (BE) degrees in Computer Sciences, Electronics and Communication, Mechanical, Civil and Electrical. It was established in 1994 and is the first engineering college in the Jammu region.

Yogananda College of Engineering and Technology
Yogananda College of Engineering and Technology is located in Muthi. The college offers engineering courses in Electrical, Civil, Computer Science, Mechanical and Information technology.

Reasi district

College of Engineering, Shri Mata Vaishno Devi University,Katra
Shri Mata Vaishno Devi University is located in Katra. It provides engineering degrees in Computer Science,  Electronics and Communication, Mechanical, Biotechnology, Architecture & Landscape Design and Energy Management.

Rajouri district

College of Engineering and Technology, Baba Ghulam Shah Badshah University, Rajouri
Baba Ghulam Shah Badshah University is located in Rajouri. It came into existence by an Act of the Jammu and Kashmir Legislative Assembly in 2002. The engineering college offers B.tech degrees in Civil, Computer Science, Electrical and Renewable Energy, Electronics and Communication and Information Technology.

See also
List of colleges affiliated to Kashmir University, Kashmir
List of colleges affiliated to Jammu University, Jammu

References

 
Engineering colleges
Jammu, and Kashmir